Princess Françoise Marie Amélie of Orléans (14 August 1844 – 28 October 1925) was a member of the House of Orléans and by marriage Duchess of Chartres.

Princess of Orléans

Françoise d'Orléans was born in Neuilly-sur-Seine the daughter of Prince François, Prince of Joinville (son of King Louis Philippe I), and of Princess Francisca of Brazil (daughter of Emperor Peter I of Brazil).

Duchess of Chartres

On 11 June 1863 at Saint Raphael's Church in Kingston upon Thames, England, she married her first cousin Prince Robert, Duke of Chartres. They had five children. Princess Françoise died in Château de Saint-Firmin.

Issue

 Princess Marie of Orléans (1865–1909), who in 1885 married Prince Valdemar of Denmark, son of King Christian IX of Denmark.
 Prince Robert of Orléans (1866–1885)
 Prince Henri of Orléans (1867–1901)
 Princess Marguerite of Orléans (1869–1940), who in 1896 married Marie-Armand-Patrice de Mac-Mahon, Duke of Magenta, son of Patrice de Mac-Mahon, Duke of Magenta.
 Prince Jean of Orléans (1874–1940), Duke of Guise, and Orléanist pretender to the throne of France as "Jean III", who, in 1899, married his first cousin Princess Isabelle of Orléans and had issue.

Ancestry

Bibliography 
  Dominique Paoli, Fortunes et infortunes des princes d'Orléans 1848-1918, Artena, Paris, 2006.
  Jean-Charles Volkmann, Généalogie des rois et des princes, Éditions Jean-Paul Gisserot, Paris, 1998.

1844 births
1925 deaths
Princesses of France (Orléans)
Burials at the Chapelle royale de Dreux
People from Neuilly-sur-Seine
Duchesses of Chartres